Sir Separanlu may refer to:
 Sir Separanlu-ye Olya
 Sir Separanlu-ye Sofla